LeRoy Martin (1929 − August 31, 2013) was an American police officer for the Chicago Police Department. In November 1987, Martin became the third African-American and second permanent to serve as superintendent of the department, following the retirement of Fred Rice Jr. (who is noted as the Chicago first permanent African-American police superintendent, Samuel Nolan was the Chicago's first African-American police superintendent who served as interim in 1979).

Biography

Early life and education 
Martin was born the fourth of five children in 1929 in Chicago, Illinois. His parents migrated to Chicago from Grenada, Mississippi in the early-1920s. Martin's father was a pullman porter. Martin was raised in the North Lawndale neighborhood on the city's west side, attending Richard T. Crane Technical High School. Martin later earned a master's degree in Public Administration and a bachelor's degree from Roosevelt University.

Career 
In the 1950s, Martin worked as a bus driver for the Chicago Transit Authority. Martin joined the Chicago Police Department in 1955 as a patrolman in the Woodlawn and Burnside neighborhoods on the city's south side. Martin was appointed superintendent of the Chicago Police Department by mayor Harold Washington on November 18, 1987. Martin served as superintendent until January 1992. After his term as superintendent, Martin served as the Director of Public Safety for the Chicago Housing Authority from 1992 until 1994. Thereafter, Martin worked in the private sector security director for Central Management Services. In 1998, Martin ran as a Republican, challenging Michael F. Sheahan to be the Sheriff of Cook County, Illinois. Martin was unsuccessful.

Personal life and death 
Martin was married to Constance B. Martin at the time of his death, having been married since 1954. Together, they had three children, Ron, LeRoy Jr., and Dawn. Martin died of a heart attack on August 31, 2013, aged 84, in Dyer, Indiana. A funeral service was held for Martin on September 6, 2013, gathering hundreds.

Electoral history

References 

1929 births
2013 deaths
Superintendents of the Chicago Police Department
Illinois Republicans
Roosevelt University alumni
African-American police officers